Ray C. Knopke (December 13, 1913 – September 19, 2011) was an American politician. He served as a Democratic member for the 67th district of the Florida House of Representatives. He also served as a member for the 23rd district of the Florida Senate.

Life and career 
Knopke was born in Chicago, Illinois. He attended St. Petersburg Junior College and Ohio State University.

In 1963, Knopke was elected to the Florida House of Representatives, serving until 1966. In the same year, he was elected to represent the 23rd district of the Florida Senate, serving until 1972. In 1974, he was elected to represent the 67th district of the Florida House, succeeding Paul Danahy. He served until 1976, when he was succeeded by Pat Collier Frank.

Knopke died in September 2011 in Tampa, Florida, at the age of 97.

References 

1913 births
2011 deaths
Politicians from Chicago
Democratic Party Florida state senators
Democratic Party members of the Florida House of Representatives
20th-century American politicians
St. Petersburg College alumni
Ohio State University alumni